is a Japanese manga series written and illustrated by Q Hayashida. It has been serialized in Shogakukan's Monthly Shōnen Sunday magazine since March 2019, with its chapters collected into five tankōbon volumes as of August 2022. The manga is licensed for English release in North America by Seven Seas Entertainment.

Synopsis

Setting
Taking place in outer space, which is divided between a "Regular Realm" and a "Dark Realm". The regular world is inhabited by two races: Aliens (also translated as "Spacelings"), who're any type of organic humanoid; and Robos, a mix of mechanical humanoids and remote-controlled puppets. Regular Space is occupied by both neutral and hostile ships, with neutral ships often sustaining themselves by carrying and selling cargo under threat of attack from hostile bandit ships; the remnants of bandit attacks, plundered and destroyed ships drifting through space, commonly litter certain routes. Neutral ships include Great Trees, children's school ships run by Solar Mass' automated light-powered robots, and the Maltekya, merchant ships staffed by lobotomized remote-controlled aliens that avoid attacks by self-destructing with little provocation.

The closest sense of order or lawfulness is the theocratic dictatorship, The Solar Mass (also translated as "Photosfere"), a series of ancient religious sects based around light magic and rumored to stem from a mysterious location named Zora. While all followers of the religion are dedicated to researching light magic and combating darkness, the faith has splintered into multiple competing sub-sects like The Light Head, who all ultimately serve their own interests. The church's higher-ranking members have managed to extend their lives to the point of being multiple centuries old, essentially living in a state of undeath through light magic and cybernetics powered by it. The church is also responsible for running multiple educational colonies for children, protected and maintained entirely by automated light-powered robots.

Meanwhile, the Dark Realm (or the "World of Darkness") is only accessible to dark beings and must be reached by passing through a black hole or equally lightless area. Dark races include dark aliens, hollow but sentient entities dubbed "Packages" and other dark creatures of varying intelligence, some of whom possess unique powers. The World of Darkness is completely non-visible to regular beings as even light cannot exist within it, resulting in the followers of Light fearing and hunting dark beings, labeling them as Daemons. Regular entities are unable to tolerate the Dark Realms, which physically and mentally warps them into shadow creatures. The Dark Realm contains unusual technologies, including Skin of Darkness robes which use shadows to protect the wearer, and Dark Cores that can provide power and life to ship entities. A common currency with merchants of Darkness is alien bones, which can be traded for dark magic and dark supplies.

Premise
Zaha Sanko, a dark alien teen with a mysterious past, lives as a vagrant and fugitive to avoid capture; a legend of him claims that possessing his bones will grant the owner any wish they desire, resulting in most aliens being hostile towards him. Travelling with his guardian and "Package of Darkness" Avakian, the duo are seeking the person offering wishes for his bones. The pair regularly crosses paths with Shimada Death, another dark alien feared as the God of Death, who commonly feeds off the corpses they create. Evading a series of attacks and using the skeletons to purchase equipment, Sanko uses a Black Core to create a sentient ship named Moja, which also leads Shimada to join their crew. This then later expands to include Hajime Damemaru, another fugitive pursued by The Solar Mass.

Characters

A teenage alien rumored to have bones that can grant any wish, making him highly susceptible to kidnapping and murder attempts. Six years prior to the main plot, Avakian falsely enrolled him into a learning colony run by The Solar Mass, hoping to both hide him and give him an education under Sanko's accidentally selected pseudonym "Meatballs And Spaghetti". Softly spoken and highly optimistic, Sanko is surprisingly upbeat and friendly despite his constantly being under threat of death. Since he regularly encounters corpses, both aliens he kills in self defense and corpses he salvages bones from for trading, Sanko regularly crosses paths with Shimada Death and considers them his friend.
He also wields a bone axe dubbed , the cut of which immediately strips skeletons of flesh and muscle.

, Avakian is a giant skeleton that has acted as Sanko's guardian for several years. Equipped with significant internal storage capacity and able to reconfigure his skeletal shape, Avakian commonly disguises himself as a novelty backpack to evade notice. Though very sinister in appearance he is very kind and nurturing towards Sanko, to the point he is very mistrustful and antagonistic towards Shimada. While he acts as the voice of reason for the group, he has also shown to be somewhat gullible and naive under pressure.
Avakian's body is covered in a transparent film of skin, dubbed , which he can use to perfectly mimic bodily parts like faces and hands to the point of fooling bio-metric scanners. Due to the nature of his body he is also completely non-flammable.

, Shimada is a flippant and care-free entity that seeks out corpses to feed from their "death", shown as spiritual clouds of fried chicken legs adored with a skull pattern and halo. Only caring for feeding their own hunger, Shimada began routinely crossing paths with Sanko when the latter was a child. Having no need for wishes, Shimada is uninterested in attacking Sanko for his bones, leading Sanko to consider them friends. While Shimada insists their relationship is purely symbiotic, over time they start showing signs of attachment to him, such as saving his life upon finding a clay model of them that Sanko crafted.
Shimada has a wide array of abilities, the extent of which are not entirely clear. Shimada claims to be immortal, can teleport, and is able to make beings die or even explode into gore by touching them. Shimada is also able to sense death, both from large distances and pre-emptively, and can identify the age of a being from looking. While outwardly female in sex, Shimada notably uses the masculine (and pretentious) pronoun ore-sama to refer to themselves; fan-translations often use male pronouns, while official translations use gender neutral ones.

A fugitive from The Solar Mass, Damemaru soon crosses paths with Sanko and is recruited into the group, his interest in evading and killing The Solar Mass being mutual. Initially trying to steal Sanko's bones, he reveals that he wishes for a new name; despite his best attempts people always refer to him as Damemaru, meaning "totally hopeless." Damemaru also has a package companion, named , though unlike Avakian it seemingly lacks a personality; Naghul'n acts as a chitinous armor suit to protect his average body from weapon damage.
While the only non-dark entity of the group, Damemaru is unique in that he is immortal, regenerative, and highly adaptive. While he can be maimed and killed much easier than the others, his body is able to slowly regenerate over time and develop resistances; while the dark energy of Sanko's ship engine initially causes him to dissolve into a heap of meat, both Damemaru and Naghul'n soon reform with a tolerance to it. Damemaru is also able to hypnotize anyone he can make prolonged eye-contact with, forcing them to do his bidding. Despite insisting he is a sixteen-year-old, he is visibly well into adulthood, with even Shimada unable to pinpoint his actual age.

A clay golem quadruped with a dog skull head, powered by a Dark Core that acts as Sanko's sentient ship. Being a small, portable duplicate of the larger ship itself, Moja provides both advice and transportation to the group. Moja is a dark creature and therefore able to survive within dark space, with its very interior exuding enough dark energy to easily dissolve non-dark entities.

Publication
Dai Dark, written and illustrated by Q Hayashida, began in Shogakukan's shōnen manga magazine Monthly Shōnen Sunday on March 12, 2019. Shogakukan has collected its chapters into individual tankōbon volumes. The first volume was published on November 12, 2019.

In July 2020, Seven Seas Entertainment announced that they have licensed the manga for an English language release in North America. The first volume was published on April 27, 2021.

Volume list

Reception
Dai Dark ranked 7th on Takarajimasha's Kono Manga ga Sugoi! list of best manga of 2021 for male readers. The series was nominated for the 2022 Next Manga Award in the print manga category and placed 14th out of 50 nominees.

References

External links
  
 

Action anime and manga
Dark comedy anime and manga
Dark fantasy anime and manga
Science fiction anime and manga
Seven Seas Entertainment titles
Shogakukan manga
Shōnen manga